V Puppis (V Pup) is a star system in the constellation Puppis. Its apparent magnitude is 4.41.  There is a binary star system at the center with a B1 dwarf orbiting a B3 subgiant star.  They have an orbital period of 1.45 days and a distance of only 15 solar radii apart. However, the system moves back and forth, indicating that there is a massive object orbiting them with a period around 5.47 years.  Based on the mass of the object, its lack of a visible spectrum, and circumstellar matter in the system with many heavy elements (as would be produced by a past supernova in the system), it is probably a black hole. However, a follow-up study could not confirm this object, but found signs that there may be a third object which is fainter than the other components.

In addition to the main system, more distant components have been reported: B, at magnitude 11.5 and separation 6.2", C, at magnitude 13.2 and separation 18.9", D, at magnitude 9.88 and separation 39", and E, at magnitude 13 and separation from D of 10.4".

References

Puppis
B-type main-sequence stars
B-type subgiants
Beta Lyrae variables
CD-48 3349
038957
3129
065818
Puppis, V
Ap stars